Bas Van den Brink (born 11 September 1982) is a Dutch former professional footballer who played primarily as a centre back.

Club career

Early career
Van den Brink played for Dutch clubs FC Utrecht, FC Emmen and Almere City FC before moving to Australia. Van den Brink made his debut in professional football at FC Utrecht. With Utrecht, he won the Dutch version of the Charity shield in 2004. This was a spectacular game as FC Utrecht managed to turn the match around in the last 5 minutes of the game to beat Ajax Amsterdam 4–2.

Gold Coast United
On 14 January 2009, he was the 21st player signed to Gold Coast United's inaugural squad. He was signed by Miron Bleiberg after watching him in an Eerste Divisie game for FC Omniworld against RBC Roosendaal. Between 2009 and 2011, he appeared in 50 league matches with Gold Coast, scoring 4 goals.

Busan I'Park
On 20 January 2011, it was announced that he would be joining South Korean K-League side Busan I'Park. However, his performance slumped and the club announced its decision to terminate his contract on 21 April.

Perth Glory
A-League club Perth Glory have announced they were interested in signing van den Brink for the up-coming season and on 7 June 2011, it was announced on that he had agreed terms. On 28 January 2013, it was announced that Perth Glory has released him from the final three months of his contract, at his request, so he could pursue other playing opportunities. Regarding this Glory coach Ian Ferguson was quoted as saying, "It was not an easy decision, but it's something we spoke about as a club and decided Bas can move on". Van den Brink said of his departure, "I am going to miss Perth, but I feel I had to go, and I’m really looking forward to a new challenge in my career."

In August 2013, it was revealed that van den Brink had retired from the game after a proposed move to I-League side Churchill Brothers fell through.

IJsselmeervogels
In 2013, Brink signed with Tweede Divisie side IJsselmeervogels and appeared in 11 league matches.

A-League career statistics
(Correct as of 19 February 2012)

Honours
Utrecht
Johan Cruyff Shield: 2004
Perth Glory
A-League: runner-up 2011–12

References

External links
 
 

1982 births
Living people
Footballers from Amsterdam
Dutch footballers
Dutch expatriate footballers
Eredivisie players
Eerste Divisie players
Derde Divisie players
FC Emmen players
Almere City FC players
FC Utrecht players
A-League Men players
Gold Coast United FC players
Perth Glory FC players
Busan IPark players
Churchill Brothers FC Goa players
IJsselmeervogels players
K League 1 players
Association football defenders
Expatriate footballers in South Korea
Expatriate soccer players in Australia
Expatriate footballers in India
Dutch expatriate sportspeople in South Korea
Dutch expatriate sportspeople in Australia